Uxelodunum (with the alternative Roman name of Petriana and the modern name of Stanwix Fort) was a Roman fort. It was the largest fort on Hadrian's Wall, and is now buried beneath the suburb of Stanwix, in Carlisle, Cumbria, England.

Roman name
The fort was called Petrianis in the Notitia Dignitatum, but on the Ravenna Cosmography it is called Uxellodamo. On the Rudge Cup it is called VXELODVM. On the Amiens Skillet it is called VXELODVNVM. It is also called VXELODVNVM on the Staffordshire Moorlands Pan. The name Petrianis comes from the cohort that was stationed there. Uxelodunum, which appears to be a latinisation of a Celtic toponym, is thought to mean High Fort.

It is thus likely that the name Petriana was a scribal error which confused the fort's name and the occupying unit, and that the fort's true name was Uxelodunum.

Description
The fort is about forty miles west of the fort of Castlesteads (Camboglanna) and five and a half miles east of Burgh by Sands (Aballava). It stands on a natural platform above the River Eden. The fort is adjacent to the Wall, which passes along its north side. Apparently the fort was intended to guard the Eden bridgehead and watch the important western route to and from Scotland.

The fort is now covered with buildings in the modern Carlisle suburb of Stanwix. However, some remains have been discovered including the parade ground and a bathhouse discovered in 2017.

Garrison
Because of the large size of the fort, it is thought to have housed a cavalry regiment, one thousand strong. This was almost certainly the Ala Petriana, the sole regiment of this size on the Wall. This was a distinguished auxiliary regiment, whose soldiers had been made Roman citizens for valour on the field of battle. It seems that the fort was given the name of its garrison, thus supplanting the earlier name of Uxelodunum.

Excavations
Excavations were made in 1932–4, and the ditch for the south rampart was traced, as well as Hadrian's Wall, which formed the north face of the fort. Barrack-like buildings were also found within the outline of the fort. In 1939 a large granary, lying east to west, was found in extending the local school-yard. In 1940 the south-west angle tower was found as well as the south and east walls.

In 1934 various objects were found which appeared to have been washed down into the river from the fort. These included brooches, mountings for cavalrymen's uniforms and harness.

The Vallum has been traced to a point just short of the south-east angle of the fort.

In 2017 a major discovery was made of the fort's bath-house, by the riverside beneath the grounds of Carlisle Cricket Club (Edenside  cricket ground). The well-preserved remains included a hypocaust for heating. Also found was an inscription to Julia Domna, the mother of the Emperor Caracalla. She was also the wife of the Emperor Septimius Severus, whom she accompanied in Britain from 208 until his death in 211 at York. The inscription prompts the question, whether Julia Domna and her husband visited Petriana.  

In summer 2021, a community archaeological dig took place on the site. It was discovered that there had been three bathhouses on the site, and a group of tiles were found with the imperial stamp of Septimus Severus.  Later finds included a group of about 30 semi-precious gems, some carved as intaglia, which were found in a drain and are thought to have been lost by bathers.  The "Uncovering Roman Carlisle" project, including the Cricket Club dig, won the Council for British Archaeology and Marsh Community Trust's Community Archaeology Project of the Year 2022 award.

References

Notes

Citations

Sources

 J. Collingwood Bruce, The Roman Wall (1863), Harold Hill & Son, 
 Frank Graham, The Roman Wall, Comprehensive History and Guide (1979), Frank Graham,

External links
 Uxelodunum at www.Roman-Britain.co.uk
 iRomans website showing Uxelodunum objects at Tullie House Museum

Forts of Hadrian's Wall
Roman fortifications in England
Roman sites in Cumbria